Vasant Narhar Phene (वसंत नरहर फेणे) (28 April 1926 - 6 March 2018, India) was a Marathi language author.  He is well known in Maharashtra for his novels and articles. In 2004, he received the N.S. Phadke (ना सी फडके ) Award for his work. His books include Central Bus Station (सेन्ट्रल बस स्टेशन), Panchkathai (पंचकथाए), Mule Ani Pale (मुले अणि पाले), and Pita-Putra (पिता पुत्र).

Phene lived in Mumbai.

References

2018 deaths
Marathi-language writers
1926 births